Rich Bar may refer to:
Rich Bar, former name of Diamondville, California
Rich Bar, Washington
Rich Bar, British Columbia, an unincorporated settlement near Quesnel, British Columbia
Rich Bar Indian Reserve No. 4, an Indian Reserve at Rich Bar, British Columbia